Dolichopus nubilus is a species of fly in the family Dolichopodidae. It is found in the  Palearctic.

References

External links
Images representing Dolichopus at BOLD

nubilus
Insects described in 1824
Asilomorph flies of Europe
Taxa named by Johann Wilhelm Meigen